In United States federal law, the Mayfield–Newton Act, or the Mayfield Act, was an act passed by the United States Congress on March 4, 1927, amending the Interstate Commerce Act, the Esch–Cummins Act, and the Uniform Bill of Lading to "authorize reduced freight rates in cases of emergency",  including earthquake, fire, flood, famine drought, epidemic, and pestilence. Sponsored by Sen. Earle B. Mayfield (D) of Texas and Rep. Walter H. Newton (R) of Minnesota, the act changed the original maximum suspension, which had been fixed by the Mann-Elkins Act of 1910, to 120 days, extendable by the Interstate Commerce Commission to 6 months – the Esch-Cummins Act reduced the extension period to 30 days while the Mayfield-Newton Act of 1927 replaced the provision with a single period of 7 months.

References

United States railroad regulation
1927 in American law